Kevin Cooney (born 1998) is an Irish hurler who plays for Galway Senior Championship club Sarsfields and at inter-county level with the Galway senior hurling team. He usually lines out as a forward.

Career

A member of the Sarsfields club, Cooney first came to prominence as a member of the club's 2015 County Championship-winning team. He first appeared at inter-county level as a member of the Galway minor team during the 2016 All-Ireland Minor Championship before winning a Leinster Championship title with the under-20 team in 2018. Cooney made his senior debut as part of Galway's 2019 Walsh Cup-winning team.

Career statistics

Honours

Sarsfields
Galway Senior Hurling Championship: 2015

Galway 
National Hurling League: 2021
Walsh Cup: 2019

References

1998 births
Living people
Sarsfields (Galway) hurlers
Galway inter-county hurlers